The discography for the Minutemen, an American punk rock band, includes four studio albums, eight extended plays, one live album and seven compilations.

Formed in 1980 by guitarist D. Boon and bassist Mike Watt, the Minutemen signed to the Californian independent record label SST Records at their second concert. Their first extended play, Paranoid Time, appeared later that year, followed by the Joy EP (on their own label, New Alliance Records) and their first studio album, The Punch Line. The Minutemen continued to release new material throughout 1982 and 1983 to a mostly local audience. In 1984, the band released Double Nickels on the Dime, their only double album and best-selling release. They continued to release more material, including the commercially oriented Project: Mersh and 3-Way Tie (For Last), until Boon's untimely death in December 1985.

Following the band's breakup, SST Records purchased New Alliance and reissued a number of recordings on compact disc and vinyl. SST also released a live album, Ballot Result, and Minuteflag, the result of an earlier collaboration with Black Flag. A three volume compilation, Post-Mersh, which combined several of the Minutemen's EPs and albums, was released between 1987 and 1989. The band's songs continued to appear in compilations, videos and soundtracks; "Corona" was the theme music of MTV'''s Jackass. A compilation album featuring a selection of songs from the band's career, the Watt-compiled Introducing the Minutemen, was released in 1998. We Jam Econo, a feature-length Minutemen film, appeared in theaters in February 2005.

Studio albums

Live albums

Extended plays

Compilations

Compilation appearances

Soundtrack appearances

Promotional releases

Music videos

Videography

Notes

References
 Azerrad, Michael. Our Band Could Be Your Life''. Little, Brown and Company, 2001. 

Punk rock group discographies
Discographies of American artists